Krzysztof Włodarczyk (born 19 September 1981) is a Polish professional boxer. He is a two-time former cruiserweight world champion, having held the International Boxing Federation (IBF) title from 2006 to 2007 and the World Boxing Council (WBC) title from 2010 to 2014.

Professional career

Włodarczyk held the IBF Inter-Continental cruiserweight title during 2001-2002, the Polish International cruiserweight title during 2002-2004, the WBC Youth cruiserweight title during 2003-2004, the World Boxing Foundation cruiserweight title in 2004, the European Union cruiserweight title in 2005, the International Boxing Council cruiserweight title during 2006-2007, the WBC FECARBOX cruiserweight title in 2006 and the IBF cruiserweight title during 2006-2007.

His trainer is Fiodor Lapin.

He won the IBF title on November 25, 2006 with a split decision over Steve Cunningham (19-0, 11KOs) but lost in a rematch on May 26, 2007.

He fought Giacobbe Fragomeni (26-1, 10KOs) on May 16, 2009 for the WBC cruiserweight title. Włodarczyk knocked down his opponent during round 9 but the fight went to a draw, in May 2010 he won a heated rematch by TKO in round 8 at the Atlas Arena in Łódź, Poland.

In September 2010, Włodarczyk defended his title against unsung Jason Robinson.
In November 2011, he successfully defended his title against Australian Danny Green (31-4, 27KOs) by TKO in the eleventh round at Challenge Stadium in Western Australia. He also beat undefeated Puerto Rican Francisco Palacios by UD and by SD in 2011/2012.

In 2013 he upset undefeated Russian Olympic champion Rakhim Chakhkiev (16-0, 12KOs) after coming off the deck to win by KO in Moscow for his arguably biggest win. On December 6, 2013 Wlodarczyk made his 6th successful title defence when he fought Giacobbe Fragomeni a third time at UIC Pavilion in Chicago. The fight was stopped after round 6 in favour of Wlodarczyk, after a cut over Fragomeni's left eye.

Wlodarczyk lost his WBC cruiserweight title on September 27, 2014 to Grigory Drozd (38-1, 27KOs). At the Krylatskoe Sport Palace in Moscow, the judges scored the bout 118:109, 119:108, 119:108 all in favour of Drozd.

On 20 May 2017, he fought undefeated contender Noel Gevor. In a rough, close fight, Wlodarczyk managed to outperform Gevor in the final rounds in order to snatch a split-decision win.

On 21 October 2017 Wlodarczyk challenged IBF champion Murat Gassiev (24-0, 18KOs) in the World Boxing Super Series quarter-final bout at the Prudential Center in Newark, New Jersey. Gassiev delivered a 3rd round KO, connecting with a left to the body dropping Wlodarczyk.

Wlodarczyk notched his 55th career win on 2 June 2018 at the G2A Arena in Rzeszow, when he outboxed Nigeria’s Olanrewaju Durodola (27-5, 25KOs) to a unanimous decision. The judges scored the fight 97:93, 97:93 and 98:92 on the third card. It was Wlodarczyk’s second victory following his first ever stoppage defeat.

On November 6, 2021 Krzysztof Wlodarczyk registered his 60th victory as Argentinian Maximiliano Gomez (29-5, 13KOs) bowed out after four rounds.

Professional boxing record

References

External links

Krzysztof Włodarczyk - Profile, News Archive & Current Rankings at Box.Live

 

1981 births
International Boxing Federation champions
Living people
Boxers from Warsaw
Polish male boxers
World Boxing Council champions
World cruiserweight boxing champions